The Brussels premetro- and  tramline 3 connects the stop Esplanade (on the borders of Neder-Over-Heembeek, Laeken (Laken) and Strombeek-Bever) with the stop Churchill in Uccle (Ukkel).

The line is named 3, after the originally planned metro line 3, which was planned to service most of the current route of tram line 3. The line was temporarily disbanded, but returned in service on 30 June 2008. The colour of the line is lime-green.

Only tram lines 3 and 4 remain in the North-South Axis that runs underneath the city centre during the daytime. In the evening, the North-South axis is serviced by tram line 32. Both lines 3 and 4 have a 6-minutes schedule during rush hour and are serviced by the modern low-floor trams (Bombardier T3000 and T4000).

On August 31, 2009 the lines 3 and 4 changed their northern termini. Whereas line 3 used to end at the North station, it now continues all the way to Esplanade, while the line 4 route was shortened to terminate at North Station. Because of this, the very long route of line 4 and the short route of line 3 are now equalized.

Before the line was taken out of service for a while, the line was serviced by both the modern low-floor trams (the T3000 and T4000) as well as the older two-part PCC-trams (T7700 and T7800). After its return in 2008, the line is serviced by the modern low-floor trams only, mostly of the T4000 type.

Route 
The route runs from Esplanade to De Wand along the N276, then follows the R21 to Van Praet where it crosses the Brussels Canal. The route then follows the N201 along the southern side of the canal to Jules de Trooz, before cutting towards the city centre along Avenue de la Reine and Boulevard Adolphe Max, connecting the Brussels North and Brussels Midi stations, via the Bourse.  The route leaves the city to the south through Saint Gilles along Rue due Lycee and the N241 to its terminus at Churchill.

It serves the following stops:
 Esplanade, serving the Brussels Expo site, close to the city's border with Flanders region.  
 De Wand 
 Araucaria 
 Braambosjes/Buissonnets
 Heembeek 
 Van Praet 
 Docks
 Mabru 
 Jules de Trooz 
 Masui 
 Thomas 
 Noordstation/Gare du Nord 
 Rogier 
 De Brouckère 
 Beurs/Bourse 
 Anneessens 
 Lemonnier 
 Zuidstation/Gare du Midi 
 Hallepoort/Porte de Hal 
 Sint-Gillis Voorplein/Parvis de Saint-Gilles 
 Horta 
 Albert 
 Berkendaal 
 Vanderkindere 
 Churchill.

See also
List of Brussels tram routes

References

External links
 STIB/MIVB

 Translated from: nl:Tramlijn 3 (Brussel)

03
City of Brussels
Forest, Belgium
Saint-Gilles, Belgium
Schaerbeek
Uccle